Jenő Konrád (13 August 1894 – 15 July 1978) also referred to as Eugen Conrad or Eugène Conrad or Eugenio Konrad was a Hungarian footballer and manager. In the 1910s he played on the Hungarian National team with his brother, Kálmán Konrád. He is most noted for his career as a football manager; he managed SC Wacker Wien, Chinezul Timişoara, Wiener AC, Hakoah Vienna, 1. FC Nürnberg, Ripensia Timişoara, 1. FC Brno, FK Austria Wien, US Triestina, and Olympique Lillois.

Honours

Manager
Chinezul Timişoara
Divizia A: 1926–27 
Ripensia Timişoara
Divizia A: 1932–33, 1935–36
Cupa României: 1935–36

References

External links
 Profile at labtof.ro
 Profile at austria-archiv.at

1894 births
1978 deaths
People from Bačka Palanka
Hungarian footballers
Hungary international footballers
MTK Budapest FC players
FK Austria Wien players
Hungarian football managers
1. FC Nürnberg managers
FK Austria Wien managers
U.S. Triestina Calcio 1918 managers
Olympique Lillois managers
FC Zbrojovka Brno managers
FC Ripensia Timișoara managers
Hungarians in Vojvodina
Expatriate football managers in Austria
Expatriate football managers in France
Expatriate football managers in Germany
Expatriate football managers in Italy
Expatriate football managers in Czechoslovakia
Hungarian expatriate football managers
Association football defenders